MOS Presents is the debut album by New Zealand hip-hop group, Misfits of Science, released in 2004.

This album made its way into the NZ top charts on 11 November 2004, in the 28th position. Peaking at 19th, this album held its spot in the Top-40, its last day on said chart being 3 January 2005, with the 40th position on the chart.

There are music videos to several tracks on this release, including "Chemical Madness", "Fools Love", and "Mmmhmm".

Track listing

Charts

References

Misfits of Science (group) albums
2004 albums